Bandi Atmakur is a Mandal in Nandyal district in the state of Andhra Pradesh in India. It is located about 284 km from Hyderabad, 84 km from  Kurnool. And 14 km from Nandyal. Bandiatmakur mandal consists of total 15 villages.

Administrative Villages

Geography
Bandiatmakur is located at  It has an average elevation of 203 metres (666 feet).

References

Mandals in Nandyal district